Golden Legs (Spanish:Piernas de oro) is a 1958 Mexican comedy sports film directed by Alejandro Galindo and starring Antonio Espino, Tere Velázquez and Marco de Carlo. It is set in the world of competitive cycling.

Cast
 Antonio Espino as Clavillazo Tachuela, piernas de oro  
 Tere Velázquez as Teresita  
 Marco de Carlo as Esteban  
 Óscar Pulido as Domingo Murrieta, presidente municipal 
 Luis Aragón as Don Melchor  
 Fidel Ángel Espino as Entrenador 
 Antonio Tanus 
 Víctor Manuel Castro
 Alfonso Zayas 
 Julián Garcia
 José Muñoz as Señor Cantino 
 Eduardo Charpenel 
 Bruno Marquez    
 Manuel Vargas M. 
 Oswaldo Fernandez 
 Polo Ortín 
 Arturo Cobo 
 Salvador Saldívar 
 Francisco Quiles 
 José Loza 
 José Wilhelmy
 Armando Acosta as Hombre en restaurante 
 Daniel Arroyo  as Espectador  
 María de Lourdes as Cantante 
 Enedina Díaz de León as Cocinera  
 Vicente Lara as Hombre en restaurante 
 Cecilia Leger as Pueblerina  
 Pedro Mago Septien as Narrador  
 Paula Rendón 
 Carlos Robles Gil as Hombre en restaurante

References

Bibliography 
 Joanne Hershfield, David R. Maciel. Mexico's Cinema: A Century of Film and Filmmakers. Rowman & Littlefield, 1999.

External links 
 

1958 films
1950s sports comedy films
Mexican sports comedy films
1950s Spanish-language films
Films directed by Alejandro Galindo
1958 comedy films
1950s Mexican films